Castle High School, previously known as John H. Castle High School is a public high school located about a mile northeast of Newburgh, Indiana on Indiana 261. Castle is one of three high schools in the Warrick County School Corporation. Until 2020, it was the only non-Evansville school that played in the Southern Indiana Athletic Conference as well as the largest high school in southwestern Indiana by enrollment. Castle High School offers classes in agriculture, art, business and computers, English, family and consumers science, industrial technology, mathematics, music and fine arts, physical education, science, social studies, resource education, and world languages. Castle also offers advance placement classes in English language, English literature, calculus, physics, chemistry, U.S. history, biology, government, anatomy, and European history.

History
In 2004, a new wing was added to the school containing a large band facility, two science labs, and several classrooms. Also associated with this project was a new weight room facility and new locker rooms for the varsity sports. In 2008, Castle began construction on a library, to supplement the existing media center, and also broke ground on the natatorium, containing an Olympic-size pool, both completed by the 2009-2010 school year.

Facilities
Castle High School is on a  site. The high school has a 6,000-seat football and track stadium. There is also a baseball and softball field, a soccer field, five tennis courts and an Olympic-size pool. The building contains two gymnasiums, the north gym with a capacity of 3500, and the south gym with a capacity of 600.

Demographics
The demographic breakdown of the 1,940 students enrolled in 2014-2015 was:
Male - 52.3%
Female - 47.7%
Native American/Alaskan - 0.3%
Asian/Pacific islanders - 3.0%
Black - 1.9%
Hispanic - 2.5%
White - 87.7%
Multiracial - 4.6%

19.6% of the students were eligible for free or reduced lunch.

Extracurricular activities

Athletics
The Castle Knights are members of the Southern Indiana Athletic Conference. The school colors are blue, white, and gold. The following IHSAA-sanctioned sports are offered:

Baseball (boys)
Basketball (boys and girls)
Girls state champion - 2006
Cross country (boys and girls)
Football (boys)
State champion - 1982, 1994
Golf (boys and girls)
Soccer (boys and girls)
Boys state champion - 2000
Softball (girls)
State champion - 2001
Swimming (boys and girls)
Tennis (boys and girls)
Track (boys and girls)
Volleyball (girls)
Unified track (co-ed)
Wrestling (boys)

Castle also offers the following club sports: archery, bowling and lacrosse (boys and girls).

Arts
The marching band, known as the Marching Knights, features over 200 members in the wind, percussion, and color guard sections. The marching band placed 2nd in the Indiana State School Music Association State Finals in 2005 and 2017, and performed in the Bands of America Grand National Finals in 2016, 2017, and 2022. In 2017 being considered the class AAA national champion. The Marching Knights also received The Sudler Shield in 2016. Castle's top jazz ensemble has performed in the ISSMA State Jazz Finals each year since its inception in 2016 and was deemed the honor band in 2017 and 2022. 

Castle is home to the Knightingales, the basic all-girls show choir, and the Knight Sensations, the advanced mixed show choir.

Notable alumni
Jamey Carroll, MLB player
Ernie Haase, gospel singer; founder of Grammy nominated Ernie Haase & Signature Sound
Marc Horowitz, artist and internet celebrity
Bryce Hunt, Olympic swimmer who competed in 2004
Michael Rosenbaum, actor known for portraying Lex Luthor on Smallville
Holli Sullivan, politician and 62nd secretary of state of Indiana

See also
 List of high schools in Indiana

References

External links

Warrick County School Corporation

 

Public high schools in Indiana
High schools in Southwestern Indiana
Newburgh, Indiana
Southern Indiana Athletic Conference
Schools in Warrick County, Indiana
1959 establishments in Indiana
Educational institutions established in 1959